Hakkı Tolunay Kafkas (born 21 March 1968) is a Turkish professional football manager and former player. He is manager of the Turkey U21 national team.

Early life
Kafkas was born in Ankara, he is of Circassian origin.

Playing career
Kafkas played as a defensive midfielder for PTT, Keçiörengücü, Diyarbakırspor, Erzurumspor, Konyaspor, Trabzonspor, Galatasaray, Bursaspor and Denizlispor in Turkey and SV Pasching, Linzer ASK and Admira Wacker Mödling in Austria. He retired in 2005.

He made his debut for the Turkey national team on 21 December 1994 against Italy. In total, he made 39 appearances for the Turkey national team scoring 3 goals. He also participated in the 1996 UEFA European Championship and the 2002 FIFA World Cup. In the latter, He scored the winning goal from a penalty kick in the 90th minute to give the team a 2–1 win over the South Africa and qualify Turkey for the last 16 of the World Cup for the first time in the nation's history. Turkey would finish the tournament in third place.

Managerial career
Kafkas started his managerial career as the head coach of the Turkish U19 National team in 2007 until his appointment as the head coach of Kayserispor prior to the 2007–08 season.

With Kayserispor Kafkas won the 2007–08 Turkish Cup and placed runner-Up in the Turkish Super Cup in 2008.

He received a UEFA Pro License in 2009.

Career statistics
Scores and results list. Turkey's goal tally first.

Managerial statistics

Honours

Player
Galatasaray
 Süper Lig: 1997–98, 1998–99
 Turkish Cup: 1998–99

Trabzonspor
 Turkish Cup: 1994–95
 Turkish Super Cup: 1995

Manager
Kayserispor
 Turkish Cup: 2007–08
 Turkish Super Cup: runner-up 2008

References

External links
 
 Profile at TFF.org
 Tolunay Kafkas at Soccerway

1968 births
Living people
Sportspeople from Ankara
Turkish footballers
Association football midfielders
Turkey international footballers
UEFA Euro 1996 players
Süper Lig players
Austrian Football Bundesliga players
Ankara Keçiörengücü S.K. footballers
Diyarbakırspor footballers
Denizlispor footballers
Konyaspor footballers
Bursaspor footballers
Trabzonspor footballers
Galatasaray S.K. footballers
Erzurumspor footballers
LASK players
FC Admira Wacker Mödling players
Turkish football managers
Süper Lig managers
Kayserispor managers
Akhisarspor managers
Turkish expatriate footballers
Turkish expatriate sportspeople in Austria
Expatriate footballers in Austria